Volodymyr Olshanskiy (born 21 February 1976) is a Ukrainian cross-country skier. He competed in the men's 15 kilometre classical event at the 2006 Winter Olympics.

References

External links
 

1976 births
Living people
Ukrainian male cross-country skiers
Olympic cross-country skiers of Ukraine
Cross-country skiers at the 2006 Winter Olympics
Sportspeople from Sumy